Maurice Lemaire was a French Gaullist politician, born on 25 May 1895 at Gerbépal in the Vosges region:  he died in Paris on 29 January 1979.

Lemaire’s background was as a railway engineer.   He was the Director General of the SNCF following the liberation of France from German occupation.   He was bald from an early age, and thereby acquired the nickname "Saint-Pierre-du-Gros-Caillou".

He represented the Vosges department in the National Assembly between 1951 and 1978.   He occupied various senior regional political posts between 1947 and 1977, throughout which period Lemaire also served as the mayor of Colroy-la-Grande.

Nationally he achieved ministerial office under three of the Fourth Republic prime ministers as follows:

  Minister for Housing and Reconstruction under Joseph Laniel between 1953 and 1954.
  Minister for Housing and Reconstruction under Pierre Mendès France between 1954 and 1955 (with a break between August and November 1954).
  Secretary of State for Trade and Industry under Guy Mollet between 1956 and 1957.

During his political career, Maurice Lemaire promoted the modernization of the tunnel which carries his name.

1895 births
1979 deaths
People from Vosges (department)
Politicians from Grand Est
Rally of the French People politicians
National Centre of Social Republicans politicians
Union for the New Republic politicians
Union of Democrats for the Republic politicians
Rally for the Republic politicians
Government ministers of France
Deputies of the 2nd National Assembly of the French Fourth Republic
Deputies of the 3rd National Assembly of the French Fourth Republic
Deputies of the 1st National Assembly of the French Fifth Republic
Deputies of the 2nd National Assembly of the French Fifth Republic
Deputies of the 3rd National Assembly of the French Fifth Republic
Deputies of the 4th National Assembly of the French Fifth Republic
Deputies of the 5th National Assembly of the French Fifth Republic
French people of the Algerian War